Tom and Jerry: Shiver Me Whiskers is a 2006 direct-to-video animated swashbuckler adventure comedy film featuring the cat-and-mouse duo Tom and Jerry. Produced by Warner Bros. Animation and Turner Entertainment, directed by Scott Jeralds, and written by Christopher Painter, the film is the fourth direct-to-video Tom and Jerry film. It was released on DVD on August 22, 2006 which was on the same day that Poseidon was released on DVD. The movie served as the pilot for the television series Tom and Jerry Tales, which premiered the following month. It was later re-released on Blu-ray on March 12, 2013.

Production

The film was scripted in 2002, before release of two other films. However, its animation was delayed; it was instead animated from February 2005 to April 2006.

Plot 
The film starts in the ocean, where an intense thunderstorm is raging. A group of jolly pirates are sailing on their ship, and Red Pirate Ron, who speaks in a language only understood by his parrot, Stan, warns his pirates to lower the sails. Later, Tom and Jerry travel aboard the same pirate ship. It is soon revealed that Ron is searching for the "Lost Treasure of the Spanish Mane" and by chance, a wave carries the map to the treasure aboard. Tom hides the map, but is warned by the ghost of the Spanish Mane's captain, Don Diego de Clippershears, that if the map is not put back into its bottle by sunset, a curse will begin. However, the bottle is swept off the ship, leaving Tom with no way to elude the curse.

At one point, Tom and Jerry escape from a giant squid knocking it out with a cannon. The ship is then attacked by Ron's brother, Blue Pirate Bob, who also speaks with the help of his parrot, Betty (with credit for the attack due to Jerry). Jerry tells them about the map to avoid being eaten by Spike. Bob's crew manages to steal the map, but Ron retrieves it and shoots down his brother's ship. Ron's crew celebrates but Jerry stops them by grabbing the treasure bottle from the ship, explaining the reason Tom lost the treasure bottle.

The sun sets and the ghost appears and begins the curse as a crew of skeleton pirates are called forth. Ron's crew abandons ship, and their lifeboat lands on top of the giant squid that Tom and Jerry fought earlier. Tom and Jerry approach the island and make it a campsite for the night while the Pirates search for the treasure. After being rapidly chased by Spike, Tom finds the ghost, who angrily abandons him for not telling him about the curse. Jerry finds the treasure chest just as the Pirates find the same way and they argue over the treasure map, causing it to fly into the sea and sink into the squid's hungry mouth. With no way to stop the curse, Tom hopelessly leaves back to the pirate ship only to discover that it bumped into a jagged rock and got stuck near the sand.

When Tom arrives, he meets Purple Pirate Paul, Ron and Bob's brother who tells him the way to stop the curse. Leading him to a tomb, he explains that it is a shelter to stop the curse and to retrieve the treasure bottle. Jerry arrives and takes refudge that night while the Pirates grieve over the loss of the treasure map. The very next morning, Tom realizes that the giant squid having spat out the treasure map, has broken the curse.

Tom and Jerry rush back to the pirate ship and rally the Pirates to find the treasure chest. and retrieve a stone egg, which is the key to unlocking the tomb's entrance, though Tom ends their partnership due to Jerry using him as live bait. Because the entrance's lock resembles a frying pan, the duo solve the puzzle by cracking open the egg and placing it on the stone pan. After maneuvering through many traps and tests (including crushing pillars and a memory game), they reach the cave that contains the treasure. Don Diego urges Jerry to take it, but this makes Jerry suspicious, as he knows that it seems too easy. His suspicions are proven correct when he sees that he must deal with the treasure's guardian first. Tom rushes inside and is shocked to see the same giant squid from earlier standing guard. When it recognizes Tom, it shrieks in fear and a stalactite crushes it. Tom and Jerry retrieve some of the treasure. When they exit the tomb, Ron, Paul and Bob (after dismissing their parrots) begin to fight over the treasure. Jerry seizes this opportunity to sneak it away and onto Bob's ship, which has been fully repaired. Tom follows Jerry by catapulting himself onto the ship.

In the pirate ship, Jerry, Tom, and Spike take full control of it with Jerry being made to be the captain, Spike being made to pilot the ship, and Tom being made to swab the deck (with Spike ensuring that he doesn't slack) while Stan, Betty, and Chuck join the trio. While Tom, Jerry, and Spike's new pirate ship sets sail and leaves Ron, Bob, Paul and their crews behind and stranded on the island, the group run from the stone chicken, which somehow reassembled itself.

Voice cast 
 William Hanna as Tom Cat and Jerry Mouse (archive recordings, uncredited)
 Kevin Michael Richardson as Red Pirate Ron, Blue Pirate Bob and Purple Parrot Chuck 
 Kathy Najimy as Blue Parrot Betty
 Charles Nelson Reilly as Red Parrot Stan
 Wallace Shawn as Purple Pirate "Barnacle" Paul and the Narrator
 Mark Hamill as spirit of Don Diego de Clippershears as skull
 Dan Castellaneta as Spike Bulldog and Additional Voices

Widescreen 
Tom and Jerry: Shiver Me Whiskers was the third Tom and Jerry film to be filmed in widescreen and the third one to be filmed in the high-definition format (the first being Tom and Jerry: Blast Off to Mars and Tom and Jerry: The Fast and the Furry), although the Region 1 DVD and the U.S. version of Boomerang were in full screen (cropping the left and right of the image) though not pan and scan as the camera stays directly in the center of the image. Like other television shows and films filmed in high-definition, the monitor the animation team would have worked from would have 16:9 and 4:3 safe areas so that the full screen version would not crop off too much of any important visual elements (such as characters). However, the film is broadcast in widescreen on Cartoon Network in the United States and released in widescreen on the Region A Blu-ray.

Reception 
David Cornelious of DVD Talk gave a positive review saying "has enough chuckles in it that it comes recommended to families and fans alike."

Follow-up film 
Tom and Jerry: A Nutcracker Tale was released on October 2, 2007.

External links

References 

2006 films
Tom and Jerry films
2006 animated films
2006 direct-to-video films
2000s American animated films
2006 action comedy films
2000s historical films
2000s children's animated films
American children's animated action films
American children's animated adventure films
American children's animated comedy films
American children's animated fantasy films
American fantasy adventure films
American action adventure films
American adventure comedy films
Films set on ships
Slapstick films
Pirate films
Treasure hunt films
American swashbuckler films
Films scored by Mark Watters
Warner Bros. Animation animated films
Warner Bros. direct-to-video animated films
2000s fantasy adventure films
2006 comedy films
2000s English-language films
Films directed by Scott Jeralds